Ruby-red piranha can refer to either of 2 species of these fish:

 Serrasalmus rhombeus (redeye piranha)
 Serrasalmus sanchezi (sharp-snouted piranha)

Piranhas